The Food Bank Singapore Ltd. was founded in 2012, and is a registered Charity and Institution of a Public Character (IPC) in Singapore. It operates as a foodbank that collects excess food from food suppliers and re-distributes them to organisations such as old folks' homes, family service centres and soup kitchens. As of 2019, it also distributes food through Food Pantry 2.0, vending machines at various locations which are accessible 24/7 to those with a special food credit card.
Food Bank Singapore is a member of the Global Foodbanking Network.

History
In Singapore the National Environment Agency publishes annual statistics, they show there are 788,600 Tonnes of food is wasted annually in Singapore, the recycling rate is only 13% (where as the overall recycling rate is 60%).

Services
The Food Bank Singapore provides various types of food donations to beneficiaries by collecting excess non-perishables from Food Industry Donors, Food Drives, and through their Bank Boxes located island-wide. Perishable food like fruits and vegetables from Pasir Panjang Wholesale Centre, cakes and pastries from F&B establishments and cooked food from hotels through their Food Rescue Project.

See also

 Feeding America
 Food waste
 List of food banks
 List of voluntary welfare organisations in Singapore
 List of food labeling regulations

References

External links
 

Food banks
Charities based in Singapore
Sustainability in Singapore
Waste management